Remi Adefarasin  BSC (born 2 February 1948) is an English cinematographer. He is educated in Photography & Filmmaking at Harrow Technical College. He started his career as a camera trainee at BBC-TV's Ealing Studios. His work on Elizabeth (1998) won him awards for Best Cinematography from BAFTA and the British Society of Cinematographers, as well as a "Golden Frog" from Camerimage and an Academy Award nomination. For his work on Elizabeth, he became the first black person to be nominated for the Academy Award for Best Cinematography.

Adefarasin was appointed Officer of the Order of the British Empire (OBE) in the 2012 New Year Honours for services to television and film.

Personal life
Adefarasin is married and has three sons.

Filmography

Footnotes

External links
Remi Adefarasin at the International Encyclopedia of Cinematographers

1948 births
Living people
Best Cinematography BAFTA Award winners
English cinematographers
English people of Nigerian descent
Officers of the Order of the British Empire